Jaana Jokinen (Sundberg) is a Finnish judoka who competes in the women's 52  kg category. At the 2012 Summer Olympics, she was defeated in the first round. She is married to the 2012 olympian Valtteri Jokinen.

Since 2018, Jokinen has worked as the head of coaching for the Finnish Judo Federation.

References

External links

 
 
 
 

Finnish female judoka
Year of birth missing (living people)
Living people
Olympic judoka of Finland
Judoka at the 2012 Summer Olympics
European Games competitors for Finland
Judoka at the 2015 European Games